Ulmus × hollandica 'Klemmer', or Flanders Elm, is probably one of a number of hybrids arising from the crossing of Wych Elm (Ulmus glabra) with a variety of Field Elm (Ulmus minor), making it a variety of Ulmus × hollandica. Originating in the Bruges area, it was described by Gillekens in 1891 as l'orme champêtre des Flandres in a paper which noted its local name, klemmer, and its rapid growth in an 1878–91 trial. Kew, Henry (1913), and Krüssmann (1976) listed it as an Ulmus × hollandica cultivar, though Henry noted its "similarity in some respects" to field elm Ulmus minor, while Green went as far as to regard it as "possibly U. carpinifolia" (:minor).

Etymology 
The name 'Klemmer' derives from the Flemish for 'climber', a reference to the tree's rapid growth and lofty height. Klemmeri, used by the Späth nursery among others, is a misnomer, incorrectly implying a proper noun Klemmer.
 
Not to be confused with 'Klehmii', a cultivar of Ulmus americana named for Charles Klehm, an Illinois nurseryman.

Description
'Klemmer' is a tall, fast growing tree, with a straight cylindrical stem and ascending branches, initially forming a narrow, conical or pyramidal head which later broadens, and producing numerous root-suckers and some epicormic shoots. The bark, smooth in young trees, is later fissured. The leaves are ovate, up to 7.5 cm (3 in) long (Krüssmann says up to 10 cm) and up to 5.0 cm (2 in) broad, shortly acuminate at the apex, the upper surface dark green, scabrous and glabrescent, the margins slightly crispate. The seed is situated close to the notch of the samara. The timber is reddish in hue, strong but liable to warping. Feneau noted (1902) that young trees were susceptible to frost damage.

Pests and diseases
'Klemmer' has no significant resistance to Dutch elm disease.

Cultivation
Common in western Flanders by the 1880s, before the first Dutch elm disease epidemic, 'Klemmer' was widely supplied and planted in avenues across Belgium and northern France, where it was much esteemed for its timber and rapid growth. Nanot (1885) and Aigret (1905) reported it as planted in the environs of Paris. The Späth nursery of Berlin supplied an U. campestris Clemmeri to the Dominion Arboretum, Ottawa, Canada, in 1893; by his 1903 catalogue Späth had renamed the cultivar U. Klemmeri, suggesting doubts about its botanical status. The tree was introduced to the USA c.1871, appearing in the catalogues of the Mount Hope Nursery (also known as Ellwanger and Barry) of Rochester, New York.

Notable trees

One of two specimens obtained in 1908 from the Barbier Nursery, France, by the Royal Botanic Gardens Kew survives at Wakehurst Place, maintained as a hedging plant, too low to attract the attention of Scolytus beetles. In the US, three 'Klemmer' elms survive (2018) at the Morton Arboretum, Illinois.
 
In 1997, a large European White Elm Ulmus laevis growing in the Ladywell Fields public park in Lewisham, London, was misidentified as a 'Klemmer' elm; an information board erected in front of the tree by Lewisham Council, still (2018) bears the erroneous name, and depicts another tree (one of the Morton 'Klemmer').

Synonymy
l'orme champêtre klemmer: Gillekens, Éléments d'arboriculture forestière 41, 1891
'Klemmer Rouge': Feneau, Bulletin de la Société centrale forestière de Belgique, 9: 162, 1902.
Ulmus campestris (: minor) var. Clemmeri: Lavallée Arboretum Segrezianum. 235, 1877.
Ulmus klemeri: Späth nursery, Berlin, 1900.

Accessions

North America
Morton Arboretum, US. Acc. no. 535–49 3 trees

Europe
Wakehurst Place Garden Wakehurst Place, UK. Acc. no. 1908–14108

References

External links
Ulmus 'Klemmer', Michigan State University Plant Encyclopedia.  
 "Herbarium specimen BR0000026204994V". Botanic Garden, Meise. Sheet labelled Klemmer rouge, Ypres area (C. Aigret; 1905)
 Shoot shoots; sheet described as U. × hollandica Mill. 'Klemmeri' Rehder, Arnold Arboretum, 1930
 Sheet described as U. × hollandica Mill. 'Klemmeri', Wageningen Arboretum, 1962 
 Long shoot. Sheet described as U. × hollandica Mill. 'Klemmeri' (from Späth). 

Dutch elm cultivar
Ulmus articles with images
Ulmus